Scaptelytra is a genus of beetles in the family Buprestidae, containing the following species:

 Scaptelytra albivittis (Hope, 1846)
 Scaptelytra aliena (Klug, 1855)
 Scaptelytra bellicosa (Blackburn, 1903)
 Scaptelytra oculicollis Kerremans, 1893
 Scaptelytra sulphureovittata (Fahraeus, 1851)

References

Buprestidae genera